Papal primacy, also known as the primacy of the bishop of Rome, is a Roman Catholic ecclesiological doctrine concerning the respect and authority that is due to the pope from other bishops and their episcopal sees. The doctrine is accepted at a fundamental level by both the Catholic Church and Eastern Orthodox Church, though the two disagree on the nature of primacy.

English academic and Catholic priest Aidan Nichols wrote that "at root, only one issue of substance divides the Eastern Orthodox and the Catholic Churches, and that is the issue of the primacy." French Eastern Orthodox researcher Jean-Claude Larchet wrote that, together with the Filioque controversy, differences in interpretation of this doctrine have been and remain the primary causes of schism between the Catholic Church and the Eastern Orthodox Church. Other Orthodox Christian theologians, however, view primacy as authoritative power: the expression, manifestation and realization in one bishop of the power of all the bishops and of the unity of the Church.

The Catholic Church attributes to the primacy of the pope "full, supreme, and universal power over the whole Church, a power which he can always exercise unhindered," a power that it attributes also to the entire body of the bishops united with the pope. The power that it attributes to the pope's primatial authority has limitations that are official, legal, dogmatic, and practical.

In the Ravenna Document, issued in 2007, representatives of the Orthodox Church and the Catholic Church jointly stated that both East and West accept the bishop of Rome's primacy at the universal level, but that differences of understanding exist about how the primacy is to be exercised and about its scriptural and theological foundations.

Dogma within Latin and Eastern Catholic Churches
The Catholic dogma of the primacy of the bishop of Rome is codified in both codes of canon law of the Catholic Church – the Latin Church's 1983 Code of Canon Law (1983 CIC) and the Eastern Catholic Churches' 1990 Code of Canons of the Eastern Churches (CCEO). The Second Vatican Council's 1964 dogmatic constitution Lumen gentium (LG) declared that the "pope's power of primacy" is by "virtue of his office, that is as Vicar of Christ and pastor of the whole Church," and is "full, supreme and universal power over the Church" which he "is always free to exercise." The primacy of the bishop of Rome, according to John Hardon in Catholic Dictionary, is "primacy of jurisdiction, which means the possession of full and supreme teaching, legislative, and sacerdotal powers in the Catholic Church"; it is authority "not only in faith and morals but Church discipline and in the government of the Church."

In  canon 331, the "bishop of Roman Church" is both the "vicar of Christ" and "pastor of the universal Church on earth." Ernest Caparros' et al. Code of Canon Law Annotated comments that this canon pertains to all individuals and groups of faithful within the Latin Church, of all rites and hierarchical ranks, "not only in matters of faith and morals but also in all that concerns the discipline and government of the Church throughout the whole world." Heinrich Denzinger, Peter Hünermann, et al. Enchiridion symbolorum (DH) states that Christ did not form the Church as several distinct communities, but unified through full communion with the bishop of Rome and profession of the same faith with the bishop of Rome.

The bishop of Rome is a subject of supreme authority over the sui iuris Eastern Catholic Churches. In  canon 45, the bishop of Rome has "by virtue of his office" both "power over the entire Church" and "primacy of ordinary power over all the eparchies and groupings of them" within each of the Eastern Catholic Churches. Through the office "of the supreme pastor of the Church," he is in communion with the other bishops and with the entire Church, and has the right to determines whether to exercise this authority either personally or collegially. This "primacy over the entire Church" includes primacy over Eastern Catholic patriarchs and eparchial bishops, over governance of institutes of consecrated life, and over judicial affairs.

Primacy of the bishop of Rome was also codified in the 1917 Code of Canon Law (1917 CIC) canons 218–221.

Development of the doctrine

The Catholic Church bases its doctrine of papal primacy on the primacy among the apostles that Jesus gave to Peter in :
and in :"Feed my lambs [...] Feed my sheep."

While acknowledging that "the New Testament contains no explicit record of a transmission of Peter's leadership; nor is the transmission of apostolic authority in general very clear," it considers that its doctrine has a developmental history and that its teaching about matters such as the Trinity, the divinity of Christ, and the union of his two natures in a single person developed as the result of drawing out from the original revealed truth consequences that were not obvious at first: "Thanks to the assistance of the Holy Spirit, the understanding of both the realities and the words of the heritage of faith is able to grow in the life of the Church 'through the contemplation and study of believers who ponder these things in their hearts'; it is in particular 'theological research [which] deepens knowledge of revealed truth.'"

Accordingly, it would be a mistake to expect to find the modern fully developed doctrine of papal primacy in the first centuries, thereby failing to recognize the Church's historical reality. The figure of the pope as leader of the worldwide church developed over time, as the figure of the bishop as leader of the local church seems to have appeared later than in the time of the apostles.

That the Christian scriptures, which contain no cut-and-dried answers to questions such as whether or not there is forgiveness for post-baptismal sins, and whether or not infants should be baptized, gradually become clearer in the light of events, is a view expressed, when considering the doctrine of papal primacy, by Cardinal John Henry Newman, who summed up his thought by saying:

Writers such as Nikolay Afanásiev and Alexander Schmemann have written that the phrase "presiding in agape", used of the Church of Rome in the letter that Ignatius of Antioch addressed to it in the early 2nd century, contains a definition of that Church's universal primacy; but the Catholic writer Klaus Schatz warns that it would be wrong to read, as statements of the developed Catholic teaching on papal primacy, this letter and the even earlier First Epistle of Clement (the name of Clement was added only later), in which the Church of Rome intervenes in matters of the Church of Corinth, admonishing it in authoritative tones, even speaking in the name of God. It was only later that the expression of Ignatius of Antioch could be interpreted as meaning, as agreed by representatives of both the Catholic and the Eastern Orthodox Churches, that "Rome, as the Church that 'presides in love' according to the phrase of St Ignatius of Antioch (To the Romans, Prologue), occupied the first place in the taxis, and that the bishop of Rome was therefore the protos among the patriarchs".

The same agreement stated:

Basis of claims to primacy

Peter and Paul
The evolution of earlier tradition established both Peter and Paul as the forefathers of the bishops of Rome, from whom they received their position as chief shepherd (Peter) and supreme authority on doctrine (Paul). To establish her primacy among the churches of the Western half of the empire, the bishops of Rome relied on a letter written in 416 by Innocent I to the Bishop of Gubbio, to show how subordination to Rome had been established. Since Peter was the only apostle (no mention of Paul) to have worked in the West, thus the only persons to have established churches in Italy, Spain, Gaul, Sicily, Africa, and the Western islands were bishops appointed by Peter or his successors. This being the case then, all congregations had to abide by the regulations set in Rome.

Primacy of Peter the apostle

Because of its association with the supposed position of Peter among the apostles, the function that, within the Catholic Church, is exercised by the Bishop of Rome among the bishops as a whole is referred to as the Petrine function, and is generally believed to be of divine institution, in the sense that the historical and sociological factors that influenced its development are seen as guided by the Holy Spirit. Not all Catholic theologians see a special providential providence as responsible for the result, but most see the papacy, regardless of its origin, as now essential to the Church's structure.

The presence of Peter in Rome, not explicitly affirmed in, but consistent with, the New Testament, is explicitly affirmed by Clement of Rome, Ignatius of Antioch, Irenaeus of Lyon and other early Christian writers – and no other place has ever claimed to be the location of his death. The same witnesses imply that Peter was the virtual founder of the Church of Rome, though not its founder in the sense of initiating a Christian community there. They also speak of Peter as the one who initiated its episcopal succession, but speak of Linus as the first bishop of Rome after Peter, although some hold today that the Christians in Rome did not act a single united community under a single leader until the 2nd century.

Role of Paul in the founding of the Church of Rome
Irenaeus of Lyon (AD 189) wrote that Peter and Paul had founded the Church in Rome and had appointed Pope Linus to the office of the episcopate, the beginning of the succession of the Roman see. Although the introduction of Christianity was not due to them, "the arrival, ministries and especially the martyrdoms of Peter and Paul were the seminal events which really constituted the Church of Rome. It was from their time, and not before, that an orderly and meetly ordained succession of Bishops originated."

Historical development

While the doctrine of the primacy of the Bishop of Rome, in the form in which it is upheld today in the Catholic Church, developed over the course of centuries, often in reaction to challenges made against exercises of authority by popes, writers both of East and West declare that from a very early period the Church of Rome was looked to as the centre of reference for the whole Church. Thus Schmemman wrote:

In their The See of Peter (1927), non-Catholic academic historians James T. Shotwell and Louise Ropes Loomis, noted the following:

Pope as arbiter
Eastern Orthodox theologian Nicholas Afanassieff cites Irenaeus in Against Heresies 3:4:1 as illuminating that during the pre-Nicene period, the Church of Rome acted as arbiter in resolving disputes between local churches. Rome's support would ensure success, while refusal from Rome predetermined the attitude the other churches would adopt.

In the aftermath of the Decian persecution, Pope Stephen I (254-257) was asked by Cyprian of Carthage (d. 258) to resolve a dispute among the bishops of Gaul as to whether those who had lapsed could be reconciled and readmitted to the Christian community. Cyprian stressed the Petrine primacy as well as the unity of the Church and the importance of being in communion with the bishops. For Cyprian, "the Bishop of Rome is the direct heir of Peter, whereas the others are heirs only indirectly", and he insisted that "the Church of Rome is the root and matrix of the Catholic Church". Cyprian wrote Pope Stephen asking him to instruct the bishops of Gaul to condemn Marcianus of Arles, (who refused to admit those who repented) and to elect another bishop in his stead.

It was to Pope Damasus I (366–384) that Jerome appealed in 376, to settle a dispute as to who, among three rival claimants, was the legitimate Patriarch of Antioch.

In the strictest sense of the word, "decretal" means a papal rescript (rescriptum), an answer of the pope when he has been appealed to or his advice has been sought on a matter of discipline. The oldest preserved decretal is a letter of Pope Siricius in response to an inquiry from Himerius, Bishop of Tarragona, in which Siricius issued decisions on fifteen different points, on matters regarding baptism, penance, church discipline and the celibacy of the clergy.

Quartodeciman controversy

The Quartodeciman controversy arose because Christians in the Roman province of Asia (Western Anatolia) celebrated Easter at the spring full moon, like the Jewish Passover, while the churches in the West observed the practice of celebrating it on the following Sunday ("the day of the resurrection of our Saviour").

In 155, Anicetus, bishop of Rome, presided over a church council at Rome that was attended by a number of bishops including Polycarp, bishop of Smyrna. Although the council failed to reach agreement on the issue, ecclesiastical communion was preserved. A generation later, synods of bishops in Palestine, Pontus and Osrhoene in the east, and in Rome and Gaul in the west, unanimously declared that the celebration should be exclusively on Sunday. In 193, Victor, bishop of Rome, presided over a council at Rome and subsequently sent a letter about the matter to Polycrates of Ephesus and the churches of the Roman province of Asia.

In the same year, Polycrates presided over a council at Ephesus attended by several bishops throughout that province, which rejected Victor's authority and kept the province's paschal tradition. Thereupon, Victor attempted to cut off Polycrates and the others who took this stance from the common unity, but later reversed his decision after bishops, that included Irenaeus of Lyon in Gaul, interceded and recommended that Victor adopt the more tolerant stance of his predecessor, Anicetus.

This incident is cited by some  Orthodox Christians as the first example of overreaching by the Bishop of Rome and resistance of such by Eastern churches. Laurent Cleenewerck suggests that this could be argued to be the first fissure between the Eastern and Western churches. According to James McCue, Victor's threatened excommunication was an "intradiocesan affair" between two local churches and did not pertain to the universal church.

First Council of Nicaea
The First Council of Nicaea was convened by the Roman Emperor Constantine I in 325. Canon IV states: "A bishop is to be chosen by all the bishops of the province, or at least by three, the rest giving by letter their assent; but this choice must be confirmed by the Metropolitan." Karl Josef von Hefele says that this was probably in response to Melitius of Lycopolis, who "had nominated bishops without the concurrence of the other bishops of the province, and without the approval of the metropolitan of Alexandria, and had thus occasioned a schism. This canon was intended to prevent the recurrence of such abuses."

First Council of Constantinople and its context

The event that is often considered to have been the first conflict between Rome and Constantinople was triggered by the elevation of the see of Constantinople to a position of honour, second only to Rome on the grounds that, as capital of the eastern Roman empire, it was now the "New Rome". This was promulgated in the First Council of Constantinople (381) canon 3 which decreed: "The Bishop of Constantinople, however, shall have the prerogative of honour after the Bishop of Rome because Constantinople is New Rome." Thomas Shahan says that, according to Photius, Pope Damasus approved the council of Constantinople, but he adds that, if any part of the council were approved by this pope, it could have been only its revision of the Nicene Creed, as was the case also when Gregory the Great recognized it as one of the four general councils, but only in its dogmatic utterances.

The increasing involvement of Eastern emperors in church matters and the advancement of the see of Constantinople over the sees of Antioch, Alexandria and Jerusalem led successive bishops of Rome to attempt a sharper definition of their ecclesial position vis-a-vis the other bishops. The first documented use of the description of Saint Peter as first bishop of Rome, rather than as the apostle who commissioned its first bishop, dates from 354, and the phrase "the Apostolic See", which refers to the same apostle, began to be used exclusively of the see of Rome, a usage found also in the Acts of the Council of Chalcedon. Pope Innocent I (401–417) claimed that all major cases should be reserved to the see of Rome and wrote: "All must preserve that which Peter the prince of the apostles delivered to the church at Rome and which it has watched over until now, and nothing may be added or introduced that lacks this authority or that derives its pattern from somewhere else." Pope Boniface I (418–422) stated that the church of Rome stood to the churches throughout the world "as the head to the members", a statement that was repeated by the delegates of Pope Leo I to the Council of Chalcedon in 451.

Relationship with bishops of other cities
Besides Rome, Jerusalem was also held in high prestige in the early Church, both because the Crucifixion and Resurrection of Jesus occurred there, and on account of the 1st-century Council of Jerusalem. Followers of Jesus were first referred to as "Christians" (as well as "Catholic") in Antioch and was, together with Alexandria, important in the thought of the early Church. It is important to note, however, that the three main apostolic sees of the early Church (i.e. the See of Antioch, the See of Alexandria, and the See of Rome) were directly related to Peter. Prior to becoming Bishop of Rome, Peter was Bishop of Antioch. Additionally, his disciple Mark founded the church in Alexandria.

Leo I
In line with the norm of Roman law that a person's legal rights and duties passed to his heir, Pope Leo I (440–461) taught that he, as Peter's representative, succeeded to the power and authority of Peter, and he implied that it was through Peter that the other apostles received from Christ strength and stability. Leo argued that the apostle Peter continued to speak to the Christian community through his successors as bishop of Rome. Pope Gelasius I (492–496) stated: "The see of blessed Peter the Apostle has the right to unbind what has been bound by sentences of any pontiffs whatever, in that it has the right to judge the whole church. Neither is it lawful for anyone to judge its judgment, seeing that canons have willed that it might be appealed to from any part of the world, but that no one may be allowed to appeal from it."

Council of Reims
In 1049, the Council of Reims, called by Pope Leo IX, adopted a dogmatic declaration about the primacy of the Roman Pontiff as the successor of Peter: "" (literal translation is "it was declared that only the bishop/pontiff of the see of Rome is the primate of the universal Church and apostolic").

Emperor Phocas' decree 
When Phocas took the Byzantine throne in 602, the Diocese of Rome, Bishop Gregory I, praised Phocas as a "restorer of liberty" and referred to him as a pious and clement lord. Meanwhile Gregory I died in 604, and also his successor, Sabinian, in 606. After almost a year of vacancy, Emperor Phocas appointed Bonafice III as the new bishop of Rome in February 19, 607 AD. Then Phocas writes through imperial decree of the Roman government, proclaims Boniface III as the "Head of all the Churches" and "Universal Bishop". Phocas transfers the title of "Universal Bishop" from Diocese of Constantinople to Diocese of Rome. Boniface sought and obtained a decree from Phocas which he restated that "the See of Blessed Peter the Apostle should be the head of all the Churches" and ensured that the title of "Universal Bishop" belonged exclusively to the Bishop of Rome. This act effectively ended the attempt by Patriarch Cyriacus of Constantinople to establish himself as "Universal Bishop".

East-West Schism

The dispute about the authority of Roman bishops reached a climax in the year 1054, when the legate of Pope Leo IX excommunicated Patriarch of Constantinople Michael I Cerularius. Leo IX had, however, died before the legate issued this excommunication, depriving the legate of its authority and thereby rendering the excommunication technically invalid. Similarly, a ceremony of excommunication of Leo IX then performed by Michael I was equally invalid, since one cannot be posthumously excommunicated. This event led to the schism of the Greek-rite and Latin-rite churches. In itself, it did not have the effect of excommunicating the adherents of the respective churches, as the tit-for-tat excommunications, even had they been valid, would have applied to the named persons only. At the time of the excommunications, many contemporary historians, including Byzantine chroniclers, did not consider the event significant.

Post-schism period

Second Council of Lyon (1272–1274) 
On 31 March 1272, Pope Gregory X convoked the Second Council of Lyon to act on a pledge by Byzantine emperor Michael VIII Palaiologos to reunite the Eastern church with the West. Wishing to end the East-West Schism that divided Rome and Constantinople, Gregory X had sent an embassy to Michael VIII, who had reconquered Constantinople, putting an end to the remnants of the Latin Empire in the East.

On 29 June 1274 (the Feast of Peter and Paul, the patronal feast of popes), Gregory X celebrated Mass in St John's Church where both sides took part. The council declared that the Roman church possessed "the supreme and full primacy and authority over the universal Catholic Church."

The council was seemingly a success, but did not provide a lasting solution to the schism. Michael's death in December 1282 put an end to the union of Lyon. His son and successor Andronikos II Palaiologos repudiated the union.

Reformation 
The primacy of the Pope was again challenged in 1517 when Martin Luther began preaching against several practices in the Catholic Church, including some itinerant friars' abuses involving indulgences. When Pope Leo X refused to support Luther's position, Luther claimed belief in an "invisible church" and called the pope the Antichrist.

Luther's rejection of the primacy of the Pope led to the start of the Protestant Reformation, during which numerous Protestant sects broke away from the Catholic Church. The Church of England also broke away from the Catholic Church at this time, although for reasons different from Martin Luther and the Protestants.

First Vatican Council 
The doctrine of papal primacy was further developed in 1870 at the First Vatican Council, where ultramontanism achieved victory over conciliarism with the pronouncement of papal infallibility (the ability of the pope to define dogmas free from error ex cathedra) and of papal supremacy, i.e., supreme, full, immediate, and universal ordinary jurisdiction of the pope.

The First Vatican Council's dogmatic constitution Pastor aeternus declared that "in the disposition of God the Roman church holds the preeminence of ordinary power over all the other churches." This council also affirmed the dogma of papal infallibility, deciding that the "infallibility" of the Christian community extended to the pope himself, at least when speaking on matters of faith.

Vatican I defined a twofold Primacy of Peter — one in papal teaching on faith and morals (the charism of infallibility), and the other a primacy of jurisdiction involving government and discipline of the Church — submission to both being necessary to Catholic faith and salvation.

Vatican I rejected the ideas that papal decrees have "no force or value unless confirmed by an order of the secular power" and that the pope's decisions can be appealed to an ecumenical council "as to an authority higher than the Roman Pontiff."

Paul Collins argues that "(the doctrine of papal primacy as formulated by the First Vatican Council) has led to the exercise of untrammelled papal power and has become a major stumbling block in ecumenical relationships with the Orthodox (who consider the definition to be heresy) and Protestants."

Forced to break off prematurely by secular political developments in 1870, Vatican I left behind it a somewhat unbalanced ecclesiology. "In theology the question of papal primacy was so much in the foreground that the Church appeared essentially as a centrally directed institution which one was dogged in defending but which only encountered one externally", according to Cardinal Joseph Ratzinger (the later Pope Benedict XVI).

Eastern Orthodox view

However, the Eastern Orthodox argue the keys to the kingdom were given not only to Peter but to all the Apostles equally. Such an interpretation, it is claimed, has been accepted by many Church Fathers; Tertullian, Hilary of Poitiers, John Chrysostom, Augustine.

It has been argued that church councils did not consider papal decisions binding. The Third Ecumenical Council was called, even though Pope Celestine I condemned Nestorius as a heretic which Michael Whelton, Catholic convert to Orthodoxy, argues shows that the council did not consider the papal condemnation as definitive.

Catholic Cardinal and theologian Yves Congar stated

21st century relations with other Christian denominations
In the document Responses to some questions regarding certain aspects of the doctrine on the Church of 29 June 2007 the Congregation for the Doctrine of the Faith reiterated that, in the view of the Catholic Church, the Christian communities born out of the Protestant Reformation and which lack apostolic succession in the sacrament of orders are not "Churches" in the proper sense. The Eastern Christian Churches that are not in communion with Rome, such as the Eastern Orthodox Church, Oriental Orthodoxy and the Assyrian Church of the East, are Churches in the proper sense and sister Churches of the Catholic particular Churches, but since communion with the Pope is one of the internal constitutive principles of a particular church, they lack something in their condition, while on the other hand the existing division means that the fullness of universality that is proper to the church governed by the successor of St Peter and the bishops in communion with him is not now realised in history.

Efforts at reconciliation

Anglican-Roman Catholic International Commission
The Anglican-Roman Catholic International Commission (ARCIC) statement of Venice (1976) states that the ministry of the bishop of Rome among his brother bishops was "interpreted" as Christ's will for his church; its importance was compared "by analogy" to the position of Peter among the apostles.

Joint worship service with the Archbishop of Canterbury
At a joint service during the first official visit of the then Archbishop of Canterbury, Robert Runcie, to the Vatican, Runcie appealed to Anglicans to consider accepting papal primacy in a reunified church. At the same time, Pope John Paul II stressed that his office must be more than a figurehead.

Ut unum sint
John Paul II invited, in Ut Unum Sint, his 1995 encyclical on commitment to ecumenism, the "pastors and theologians" of Churches and Ecclesial Communities not in full communion with the Catholic Church to suggest how to exercise papal primacy in ways that would unite rather than divide.

Joint International Commission for Theological Dialogue
In October 2007, the Joint International Commission for Theological Dialogue Between the Catholic Church and the Orthodox Church, agreed that the pope has primacy among all bishops of the Church, something which has been universally acknowledged by both churches since the First Council of Constantinople in 381 (when they were still one Church) though disagreements about the extent of his authority still continue.

The document "draws an analogy among the three levels of communion: local, regional, and universal, each of which appropriately has a 'first' with the role of fostering communion, in order to ground the rationale of why the universal level must also have a primacy. It articulates the principle that primacy and conciliarity are interdependent and mutually necessary." Speaking of "fraternal relations between bishops" during the first millennium, it states that "these relations, among the bishops themselves, between the bishops and their respective protoi (firsts), and also among the protoi themselves in the canonical order (taxis) witnessed by the ancient Church, nourished and consolidated ecclesial communion." It notes that both sides agree "that Rome, as the church that 'presides in love' according to the phrase of St Ignatius of Antioch, occupied the first place in the taxis (order) and that the bishop of Rome was, therefore, the protos (first) among the patriarchs. They disagree, however, on the interpretation of the historical evidence from this era regarding the prerogatives of the bishop of Rome as protos, a matter that was already understood in different ways in the first millennium"; and "while the fact of primacy at the universal level is accepted by both East and West, there are differences of understanding with regard to the manner in which it is to be exercised, and also with regard to its scriptural and theological foundations".

Discussions continued at Aghios Nikolaos, Crete, (a drafting committee) in September–October 2008; at Paphos, Cyprus, in October 2009; and Vienna, Austria in September 2010. Hegumen Filipp Ryabykh, the deputy head of the Russian Orthodox Church Department for External Church Relations said:

A 2008 draft text on "The Role of the Bishop of Rome in the Communion of the Church in the First Millennium" topic prepared by the Joint International Commission for Theological Dialogue Between the Catholic Church and the Orthodox Church was leaked in 2010, which the Vienna meeting asked to be revised and amplified. This document states that "Catholics and Orthodox agree that, from apostolic times, the Church of Rome has been recognised as the first among the local Churches, both in the East and in the West." Both sides agree that "the primacy of the see precedes the primacy of its bishops and is the source of the latter". While in the West, "the position of the bishop of Rome among the bishops was understood in terms of the position of Peter among the apostles ... the East tended rather to understand each bishop as the successor of all the apostles, including Peter"; but these rather different understandings "co-existed for several centuries until the end of the first millennium, without causing a break of communion".

Opposition to the doctrine

American religious author Stephen K. Ray, a Baptist convert to Catholicism, asserts that "There is little in the history of the Church that has been more heatedly contested than the primacy of Peter and the See of Rome. History is replete with examples of authority spurned, and the history of the Church is no different."

Protestant view
The topic of the Papacy and its authority is among the main differences between the Catholic Church and many other Christian denominations. For those who hold to the doctrine of sola scriptura, the Bible is considered to be the sole authority on Christian doctrine and theology.

Michael H. Crosby, a renowned religious studies expert, says in his book Repair My House: Becoming a "Kingdom" Catholic, that Matthew 16:18–19 does not support the authority given to Peter and that the keys were given not to Peter alone but to the whole church. Some translations of the Bible, like the writings of St. John Chrysostom, considered that Jesus was considering the proclamation made by Peter to be the rock and foundation of the faith. Compared to other Catholic translations that say, even if Peter is the "rock", it does not support exclusive authority.

See also

Notes

References

Citations

Sources 

 

 Translation taken from 

 Reprinted in  
 

 Leaked in 

 Reprint of 

 This work is found in numerous revisions.

 Reprint of 

 Reprint of 

 Possibly based on 

 Translated from

Bibliography

External links

 
Primacy
Christian terminology